Westmoreland station may refer to:

Westmoreland station (DART), a light rail station in Dallas, Texas
Westmoreland Road goods yard, a GWR goods station in Bath, England
Westmoreland station (SEPTA), a station on the Chestnut Hill West Line in Philadelphia, Pennsylvania